This page covers important events in the sport of squash in 2022. Primarily, it provides the results of notable tournaments throughout the year on PSA tour, World , continental and national championships.

PSA

This table show the most relevant events hosted by the PSA like PSA World Championship or World Tour Platinum events. For all remaining events check the main page.

PSA World Championship

PSA World Tour

Only platinum and gold events

PSA World Tour Finals

WSF

This section show the most relevant events hosted by the WSF and continental federations like World Team Championships or European, Asian... Championships.

National championships
These are the winners of the most relevant national squash championships held during 2022.

References

External links
Professional Squash Association (PSA)
World Squash Federation

 
Squash by year
2022 sport-related lists